The Tawatinâ Bridge is an extradosed LRT bridge crossing the North Saskatchewan River in Edmonton, Alberta. Below the concrete box girder spans is a suspended eight-meter wide shared-use path, which was opened to the public on December 12, 2021.  It will be part of Edmonton Transit Service's Valley Line extension, which is scheduled to open in 2022 (tentative). The Tawatinâ Bridge consists of two railway tracks (one northbound towards Downtown Edmonton, one southbound towards Mill Woods).  

 means "valley" in Cree. The bridge features 400 pieces of art by Métis artist David Garneau, Indigenous artists, and Regina artist Madhu Kumar with other non Indigenous artists. These are fixed to the underside of the box girder and visible from the multi-user pathway.

See also 
 List of crossings of the North Saskatchewan River
 List of bridges in Canada
 Valley Line (Edmonton)

References

Bridges in Edmonton
Railway bridges in Alberta
Edmonton Light Rail Transit
Pedestrian bridges in Canada
Light rail bridges